Stien Eelsingh (1903-1964) was a Dutch painter.

Biography
Eelsingh was born on 1 September 1903 in Zwolle. She was the recipient of the Koninklijke subsidie voor vrije schilderkunst (Royal grant for free painting). Her work was included in the 1939 exhibition and sale Onze Kunst van Heden (Our Art of Today) at the Rijksmuseum in Amsterdam.

Eelsingh died on 18 June 1964 in Meppel.

References

External links
images of Eelsingh's work on ArtNet

1903 births
1964 deaths
20th-century Dutch women artists
People from Zwolle
Dutch women painters